Jericho Creek is a tributary of Jordan Creek in Vermillion County, Indiana.

References

Rivers of Indiana